The 1994 Ottawa Rough Riders finished 4th place in the East Division with a 4–14 record. They were defeated in the East Semi-Final by the Winnipeg Blue Bombers.

Offseason

CFL draft

Preseason

Regular season

Season standings

Regular season

Schedule

Postseason

Awards and honours

1994 CFL All-Stars
None

Eastern All-Stars
DE – John Kropke, CFL Eastern All-Star
LB – Daved Benefield, CFL Eastern All-Star

References

Ottawa Rough Riders seasons